The 1999 Grand Prix Hassan II was an Association of Tennis Professionals tennis tournament held in Casablanca, Morocco. It was the 15th edition of the tournament and was held from March 22 to March 29, 1999.

Finals

Singles

 Alberto Martín defeated  Fernando Vicente, 6–3, 6–4.
 It was Martin's 1st singles title of his career.

Doubles

 Fernando Meligeni /  Jaime Oncins defeated  Massimo Ardinghi /  Vincenzo Santopadre, 6–2, 6–3.
 It was Meligeni's only title of the year and the 10th of his career. It was Oncins's 2nd title of the year and the 6th of his career.

References

External links
 ITF tournament edition details
 ATP tournament profile

 

 
Grand Prix Hassan II
Grand Prix Hassan II